Humfrid (also Humfred or Hunfrid) is a masculine given name of Germanic origin. It may refer to:
Humfrid, count of Barcelona
Humfrid (bishop), archbishop of Magdeburg
Hunfrid, Margrave of Istria, Italian nobleman
Humphrey of Hauteville, count of Apulia

See also
Humphrey (disambiguation)
Humphry, given name and surname
Humfrey, given name and surname